Antsiferov (feminine form: Antsiferova) is a Russian-language surname derived from the archaic Russian first name "Antsifer" (Анцифер), in turn derived from "Onisifor" (Онисифор, Onesiphorus).

People with the name include:
Alexei Antsiferov (born 1991), a Kazakhstani-Russian ice hockey player 
Danila Antsiferov (died 1712), Russian explorer, after whom Antsiferov Island in the Kuril Islands is named
Nikolai Antsiferov (1889–1958), Russian historian

See also

Russian-language surnames